The Banquet of the Officers of the St George Militia Company may refer to two paintings by Frans Hals:

 The Banquet of the Officers of the St George Militia Company in 1616
 The Banquet of the Officers of the St George Militia Company in 1627

See also 

 The Officers of the St George Militia Company in 1639